Ocker is a ghost town in Bell County, in the U.S. state of Texas. It is located within the Killeen-Temple-Fort Hood metropolitan area.

History
Ocker was founded by Czech settlers in the 1880s. A post office was established at Ocker in 1888 and remained in operation until 1904. Both were named for store owner and postmaster B. Ocker. There was a general store, a mill and gin, a sorghum manufactory, a doctor, and a barber in the community in 1890. Three years later, 78 Czech families were found to be living in the area and had an official population of 55 in 1896, with another gin and two churches. The Rolnicky Vzajemni Orchranni Spolek Statu Texas was founded in 1901 and was a farmers' mutual aid and insurance company for local Czech farmers. Its population dropped to 20 in 1933 and then 10 in 1964. It disappeared in 1968 and only a Brethren church stood two miles south of the original townsite. This church was listed on a 2000 county highway map and received a Texas State Historical Marker in 1994.

Geography

References

Ghost towns in Texas